Local Route 22 Yeosu–Suncheon Line is a local route of South Korea that connecting Sepo 3-IS in Hwayang-myeon, Yeosu, South Jeolla Province to Sungo 5-IS in Jangcheon-dong, Suncheon, South Jeolla Province.

History
This route was established on 19 July 1996.
 19 July 1996 : Established Hwajeong-myeon, Yeocheon County – Suncheon segment Local Route 22 Yeocheon – Suncheon Line
 25 August 2001: Changed the name to Local Route 22 Yeosu – Suncheon Line
 31 October 2013 : Moved 298m in Anpo-ri, Hwayang-myeon, Yeosu

Stopovers
 South Jeolla Province
 Yeosu (Hwayang-myeon - Sora-myeon - Hwajang-dong - Sora-myeon - Yulchon-myeon) - Suncheon (Haeryong-myeon - Jorye-dong - Yeonhyang-dong - Pungdeok-dong - Ocheon-myeon - Deokwol-dong - Namjeong-dong - Inje-dong)

Major intersections 

 (■): Motorway
IS: Intersection, IC: Interchange

South Jeolla Province

Road names
 Yeosu
 Sepo 3-IS – Jungnim 4-IS : Hwayang-ro
 Jungnim 4-IS – Jungnim Gwangjang : Dowon-ro
 Jungnim Gwangjang – Deogyang IS : Deogyang-ro
 Deogyang IS – Yulchon Tunnel: Expo-daero
 Suncheon
 Yulchon Tunnel – Seongsangyo : Expo-daero
 Seongsangyo – Sindae IS : No name
 Sindae IS – Sangbi IS : Mupyeong-ro
 Sangbi IS – Jorye 4-IS : Sungwang-ro
 Jorye 4-IS – Palma 4-IS : Baekgang-ro
 Palma 4-IS – Hohyeon 3-IS : Namseungnyong-ro
 Hohyeon 3-IS – Sungo 5-IS : Useok-ro

Motorway
Deogyang IS – Sangbi IS segment is a motorway, so only car can be driven.

References

22
Yeosu
Suncheon
Roads in South Jeolla